Surrey Record Society is a text publication society which edits and publishes historic records relating to the county of Surrey, England. The society concerns itself with the historic county, which includes, in addition to the current administrative county, the areas now forming the London boroughs of Lambeth, Wandsworth, Southwark, Croydon, Kingston, Merton, Sutton, and Richmond. The Society has also published two editions of registers of medieval bishops of Winchester, Surrey having historically formed part of the Diocese of Winchester.

History
The Society was established in 1912, largely on the initiative of Hilary Jenkinson (1882–1961), then an archivist at the Public Record Office and also honorary secretary of the Surrey Archaeological Society. It had become clear that the Archaeological Society was unable or unwilling to commit itself to a sustained programme of publication of archival sources for the county's history, and Jenkinson believed that an entirely new body was necessary. He became its secretary, and his Record Office colleague M. S. Giuseppi its general editor. Giuseppi stood down in 1924 to be succeeded by Jenkinson, who held the positions of secretary and general editor jointly until 1950. In that year he was elected president of the Society. In these roles, Jenkinson established many of the principles of record editing and publication which were subsequently adhered to not only by the Surrey Record Society itself, but also more widely.

Publications
The Society's first publication, which appeared in two volumes issued in parts between 1913 and 1924, was Registrum Johannis de Pontissara, the register of John of Pontoise (d. 1304), Bishop of Winchester 1282–1304.

Recent volumes, which illustrate the range of subject-matter addressed, have included:

Publication numbering and formats
In the interest of speedy publication, it was the Society's practice in its early decades to issue its texts in serial form, as editing work progressed, in "parts" (or fascicles), with card covers. The intention was that, once all the parts comprising a volume had appeared, members could bind them together. Some volumes were issued in parts irregularly over several years, interspersed with parts of other volumes. Publications were generally issued with two separate numerical identifiers, a volume number and a "number" (i.e. a part number), but the details supplied on the covers and title-pages were not always complete or consistent. The practice led to bibliographical confusion for librarians and readers, and was abandoned after the Second World War. Beginning with volume 22 (published in 1955), all volumes were issued complete. 

From volume 25 (1964) onwards, all volumes have been published in a uniform burnt sienna hardback binding.

References

External links
 

1912 establishments in England
Organizations established in 1912
Organisations based in Surrey
History of Surrey
Small press publishing companies
Historical societies of the United Kingdom
Text publication societies
Archives in Surrey
Heritage organisations in the United Kingdom
History organisations based in the United Kingdom
Book publishing companies of England